Pierre Steinmetz (born 23 January 1943 in Sainte-Colombe, Rhône) was a member of the Constitutional Council of France between 2004 and 2013.

References

1943 births
Living people
People from Rhône (department)
Sciences Po alumni
École nationale d'administration alumni
French civil servants
Commandeurs of the Légion d'honneur
French people of German descent